The AIIMS Metro Station is located on the Yellow Line of the Delhi Metro.

The entrances are on Aurobindo Marg, the east side just outside the All India Institute of Medical Sciences. Safdarjung Hospital is just west of the station.

The Station

Station layout

Facilities
List of available ATMs at AIIMS metro station: HDFC Bank, YES Bank, State Bank of India, IndusInd Bank

Entry/exit

Connections

Bus
Delhi Transport Corporation bus routes number 335, 502, 503, 505, 507CL, 512, 516, 517, 519, 520, 536, 542, 548, 548CL, 548EXT,
605, 725, serve the station from the nearby AIIMS bus stop.

See also

References

External links

 Delhi Metro Rail Corporation Ltd. (Official site) 
 Delhi Metro Annual Reports
 

Delhi Metro stations
Railway stations opened in 2010
Railway stations in South Delhi district
2010 establishments in Delhi